Ban Mueang was a king of Sukhothai, an ancient kingdom in Thailand. He was from the House of Phra Ruang.

Name

The name Ban Mueang means "one who delights the nation".

In Thai, the name is usually misspelt as "บาลเมือง", which is pronounced the same and means "one who protects the nation".

He is merely referred to as Ban (บาน) in the Pu Khun Chit Khun Chot Inscription (Inscription No. 45), created in 1935 BE (1392/93 CE).

Life

He was the second son of King Si Inthrathit of Sukhothai and his wife, Sueang. He succeeded his father to the throne of Sukhothai in an unknown year and reigned until his death, which occurred around 1822 BE (1279/80 CE).

The Ram Khamhaeng Inscription (Inscription No. 1), which was allegedly created in 1835 BE (1292/93 CE) and contains an autobiography of his younger brother, Ram Khamhaeng, states:

My father was named Si Inthrathit. My mother was named Lady Sueang. My elder brother was named Ban Mueang. There were five of us born from the same womb: three boys and two girls. My eldest brother died when he was still a child... In my father's lifetime, I served my father and I served my mother. When I caught any game or fish, I brought them to my father. When I picked any acid or sweet fruits that were delicious and good to eat, I brought them to my father. When I went hunting elephants and caught some, either by lasso or by driving them into a corral, I brought them to my father. When I raided a town or village and captured elephants, men and women, silver or gold, I turned them over to my father. When my father died, my elder brother was still alive. I served him steadfastly as I had served my father. When my elder brother died, I got the whole kingdom for myself.

Ban Mueang is also mentioned in the Pu Khun Chit Khun Chot Inscription which describes the lineage of the House of Phra Ruang.

As stated by both inscriptions, Ban Mueang was, upon his death, succeeded by his younger brother, Ram Khamhaeng.

A historical document, Jinakalamali, states that Ban Mueang had a son, Ngua Nam Thum, who later became a king of Sukhothai.

A great-great-grandchild of Ban Mueang was named after Ban Mueang according to the ancient custom of naming a baby after its ancestor. The great-great-grandchild ascended the throne of Sukhothai as Mahathammaracha IV.

References

Bibliography

 
 
 
 
 
 
 

Kings of Sukhothai
Year of birth unknown
13th-century monarchs in Asia
Thai princes
13th-century Thai people
1279 deaths
Year of death uncertain